Schijndel is a town and former municipality in the southern Netherlands, in the province of North Brabant. Schijndel was founded on 6 December in the year 1309. On 1 January 2017 Schijndel, together with Veghel and Sint-Oedenrode, merged into a new municipality called Meierijstad creating the largest municipality of the province North-Brabant in terms of land area.

Population centres 
Schijndel
Wijbosch

This figure has remained virtually unchanged since the 1990s.

Topography

Dutch Topographic map of the municipality of Schijndel, June 2015

Notable residents

Gérard Buzen, Belgian general\minister of defense
André Gevers, cyclist
Winy Maas, architect
Wiljan Vloet, football manager
Rai Vloet, football player and son of Wiljan Vloet
Carli Hermès, photographer and director
Jack de Gier, football player
Hein van de Geyn, jazz bassist
Sissy van Alebeek, cyclist
Ronald Mutsaars, cyclist
Manon van den Boogaard, football player
Said Ali Hussein, football player

Trivia
In the 2010 film New Kids Turbo, the city is hit by a huge bomb that was originally intended to destroy neighboring Maaskantje. Finally, in the sequel New Kids Nitro, a bitter fight rages between a group of young men and a woman from Schijndel and a group of young men from Maaskantje. This also brought Schijndel to the attention of New Kids fans, who had previously almost exclusively traveled to Maaskantje to visit locations from the series and the films.

References

Meierijstad
Populated places in North Brabant
Former municipalities of North Brabant
Municipalities of the Netherlands disestablished in 2017